is a female racewalker from Japan. She competed in the women's 20 kilometres walk event at the 2015 World Championships in Athletics in Beijing, China.

She competed in the women's 20 kilometres walk at the 2022 World Athletics Championships held in Eugene, Oregon, United States.

See also
 Japan at the 2015 World Championships in Athletics

References

External links

Living people
1991 births
Japanese female racewalkers
Olympic female racewalkers
Olympic athletes of Japan
Athletes (track and field) at the 2016 Summer Olympics
Athletes (track and field) at the 2020 Summer Olympics
Asian Games bronze medalists for Japan
Asian Games medalists in athletics (track and field)
Athletes (track and field) at the 2018 Asian Games
Medalists at the 2018 Asian Games
World Athletics Championships athletes for Japan
Japan Championships in Athletics winners
People from Ageo, Saitama
Sportspeople from Saitama Prefecture
20th-century Japanese women
21st-century Japanese women